Ospina Coffee was established in Colombia, by Don Mariano Ospina Rodríguez in 1835. Ospina Rodríguez was one of the pioneers of coffee growing in Colombia and in Guatemala.

Summary 

Three Colombian presidents were part of this family business, including Mariano Ospina Rodríguez (1857–1861), Pedro Nel Ospina (1922–1926) and Mariano Ospina Pérez (1946–1950). Ospina Pérez was one of the founding fathers of the National Federation of Coffee Growers of Colombia.

Ospina Coffee originated in Colombia's volcanic highlands of the Andes, South America, founded by Ospina Rodríguez, who started his coffee business in 1835. His experimental farm at Fredonia, Antioquia served as a model finca cafetera (coffee plantation) for Colombian coffee growers in the late nineteenth century.

Harvard Professor June Erlick, author of the book "Una Gringa en Bogotá," explains that "Coffee in Colombia was traditionally grown by very small farmers." She says the Ospinas helped to change the way the world viewed coffee. "The Ospina family was the first, or certainly one of the first, to see coffee as a larger crop and business."

History 
Mariano Ospina Rodríguez established his first experimental plantation in 1835, in the municipality of Fredonia, Antioquia.

After Ospina Rodríguez and his brother Pastor escaped from prison into exile, in 1862, they settled in Guatemala.  Factors cited in their having been able to distinguish themselves there include success in inserting themselves into Guatemala's political and economic activities, access to international credit, solid family alliances, and, in particular, their experience as the owners of “Las Mercedes”, one of the largest and most famous coffee plantations of Central America in those times.

In 1863, Ospina Rodríguez, former President of the Granadine Confederation (now Colombia), arrived in Guatemala with his wife Enriqueta Vásquez, his four younger children and his brother Pastor. They had been granted political asylum by the Guatemalan government. They settled in the Pacific piedmont region called “Costa Cuca”, where they established their main coffee plantation “Las Mercedes”. This coffee plantation became known throughout Central America as the most productive and best managed.

Mariano Ospina Rodríguez returned to Colombia with his wife Enriqueta and their children in October 1871. They relocated in the town of Fredonia, Antioquia, where they continued with their coffee business, enterprise and plantations.

In 1880, the National Press (of Colombia) published the first instruction manual for coffee growing, written by Ospina Rodríguez, titled “Cultivo del Café: Nociones Elementales al alcance de todos los labradores” (Coffee Growing: Basic notions available to all farmers). Ospina Rodríguez dedicated much of his efforts to educating others about coffee.  In 1931, a second instruction manual for coffee growers was published under the direction of his grandson, Mariano Ospina Pérez, as General Manager of the National Federation of Coffee Growers of Colombia.

In 1882, Ospina Rodríguez and his two sons, Mariano and Tulio, established their first of several large scale coffee plantations and organized their larger coffee processing plants and facilities ("despulpadoras" or “edificios del café”) in “El Cerro Bravo”, of Fredonia, Antioquia. The first mechanized pulpers and mills were introduced and operated in these plantations.

Colombian President Pedro Nel Ospina, son of Ospina Rodríguez, took over the business in 1879.

By 1888, the best known coffee plantations in Antioquia were: “Jonas”, belonging to Mariano Ospina Vásquez, “El Amparo”, belonging to Tulio Ospina Vásquez, “La Caraboya”, belonging to the Barrientos brothers and “Gualanday”, belonging to the heirs of General Rafael Uribe Uribe. These four coffee plantations produced 46% of the coffee grown in Antioquia.

The Ospina coffee operations (growing, processing and exports to Europe and USA) were all directed by Ospina Rodríguez until the day of his death, on January 11, 1885, in Medellín.

General Pedro Nel Ospina, besides managing his family's private coffee enterprises, contributed as well to the Colombian coffee industry. He used his ambassadorship to the United States in 1910 as an opportunity to promote the industry. Elected president in 1922, he established the Banco de la Republica (Central Bank) and advanced the national railway system to facilitate the commerce and export of coffee.

At the death of Tulio Ospina Vásquez, his son, Mariano Ospina Pérez, inherited several of the plantations. Ospina Pérez also took over the business. He later founded the National Federation of Coffee Growers of Colombia, organizing the nation's coffee industry and making it one of the leading commodities produced in the country. In 1946 Ospina Pérez was elected president of Colombia. Current Ospina Coffee owner Mariano Ospina states that it was Ospina Pérez who envisioned the creation of the fictional character Juan Valdez, the TV pitchman with his burro, who came to symbolize coffee from Colombia.

References

Further reading 
Books
 The History of coffee in Guatemala, Von Regina Wagner, William H. Hempstead,Cristóbal von Rothkirch, Villegas Editores, Pages 61–69, Bogotá, Colombia, 2001 
 Biografía del Café: Malcom Deas, Agosto, 2009 
 Gobernantes Colombianos, Ignacio Arismendi Posada, Interprint, Bogotá, Colombia, 1983.
 Coffee in Colombia 1850–1979, Marco Palacios, Cambridge, Latin American Studies.
 Mariano Ospina Pérez, Un Hombre de Acción y de Principios, Miguel Angel Lozano, Fundación de Estudios Historicos, Misión Colombia
 Funadación Mariano Ospina Pérez, Editorial El Globo SA, Bogotá, Colombia, November, 1991.
 1200 Años de Historia: Historia, Relatos y Genealogía de los Ospinas, Mariano Ospina Peña, Bogotá, Colombia, 2004 
 Ospina Supo Esperar, Jaime Sanín Echeverri, Editorial Andes, Bogotá, Colombia, Marzo de 1978.
 La vida del General Pedro Nel Ospina: Emilio Robledo 1956, Autores Antioquenos Vol 8, Medellín, Fundación de Educación Superior Mariano Ospina Pérez, Nov. 2009.
 El Bogotazo, Memorias del Olvido, Arturo Alape, Publicaciones Universidad Central, Grupo Comercial MARK, Bogotá, Colombia, Marzo, 1983.
 Los Pueblos del Café, Fernando Turk Rubiano, Editorial Nomos, Bogotá, 1996 
 El Café y la Familia Ospina, Ernesto Ramírez, Universidad Nacional, Bogotá, Colombia, 1984.
 Café, Caminos de Herradura y el Poblamiento de Caldas, Pedro Felipe Hoyos Körbel, Tercer Mundo Editores, Bogotá, 2001 
 El Gran Libro de Colombia, Saint Vincent des Horts, Circulo de Lectores S.A., vol. 2, España, 1982, Deposito Legal: B. 9254-1982
 El Oidor Mon y Velarde, Regenerador de Antioquia, Tulio Ospina Vásquez, Manizales, Archivo Historial, No. 37, 1924
 Tres Presidentes de Colombia, Juan Antonio Pardo Ospina, Bogotá, Colombia.
 La Familia Ospina, Fernando Panesso Posada, Revista Universidad de Medellín, Numero 3, Medellín, Colombia.
 Biografía del Café, Malcon Deas, et al., La Otra Editorial Ltda., Bogotá, 2009, 

 Encyclopedic Works
 U.S. Department of State, Colombia, Ospinas, Washington, DC, USA
 Historia de Colombia: Mariano Ospina Rodríguez, Pedro Nel Ospina, Mariano Ospina Pérez, Biblioteca Luis Angel Arango, Bogotá, Colombia
 Encyclopædia Britannica: Mariano Ospina Rodríguez, Pedro Nel Ospina, Mariano Ospina Pérez.
 El Continente de los Siete Colores, German Arciniegas, Buenos Aires, Editorial Sudamericana, 1965.
 Historia de America, Rafael Maria Granados, Bogotá, Colombia, 1953.
 Diccionario Biografico y Bibliografico de Colombia, Editorial Cromos, Bogotá, Colombia, 1926.

 Newspapers Articles
 The Charlotte Observer, Gourmet Coffee by Cristina Breen, February 14, 2003.
 The Charlotte Observer, Sunday Business, The Insider, Don Hudson, Sunday, June 6, 2004.
 The Charlotte Observer, The Observer's Choice, Best of 2004, Tuesday, June 8, 2004.
 The Charlotte Observer, The Insider, by Jeff Elder, Monday, October 2, 2006.
 The Charlotte Observer, The King of Coffee in Exile by Jeff Elder, Sunday, March 16, 2008.

 Magazines
 Robb Report, Best of the Best 2004, Singular Essentials by Jessica Taylor, Volume XXVIII, June, 2004.
 Target Trends Magazine, The Taste of Ospina Coffee, Shanghai, China, April, 2005.
 Robb Report, Best of the Best 2005, Pure Perfection by SGS, Volume XXIX, June, 2005.
 Uptown Magazine, Damn That's Some Good Coffee by Thomas Carrig, Charlotte, NC, March, 2007.
 Robb Report, Best of the Best 2007, Of Note by James N. Dimonekas, Volume XXXI, June, 2007.
 Robb Report Motor Cycling, Haute Coffee by Jennifer Hall, Volume 2, Number 2, Summer 2005.
 Evasion's International, Les Cafés Exceptionales by Rufus Willis, Paris, France, March, 2005.
 SouthPark Magazine, Premium Blend by Lee Rohdes, Charlotte, NC, October, 2007.
 Robb Report, 21 Ultimate Gifts, Volume XXXIII, No. 12, December, 2009.

External links 
 
 

Coffee companies of Colombia
Companies established in 1835
Food and drink companies established in 1835